Prvačina is a village in the Vipava Valley in western Slovenia. It lies within the Municipality of Nova Gorica.

The parish church in the settlement is dedicated to Saint Andrew and belongs to the Diocese of Koper.

References

External links

Prvačina on Geopedia

Populated places in the City Municipality of Nova Gorica